1089 Tama, provisional designation , is an elongated Florian asteroid and synchronous binary system from the inner regions of the asteroid belt, approximately 12 kilometers in diameter.

It was discovered by Japanese astronomer Okuro Oikawa at the old Tokyo Astronomical Observatory on 17 November 1927. The asteroid was named after the Tama River in Japan. Its minor-planet moon was discovered in December 2003 and measures approximately 9 kilometers.

Orbit and classification 

Tama is a member of the Flora family, a giant asteroid family and the largest family of stony asteroids in the main-belt. It is, however, a non-family asteroid from the main belt's background population when applying the Hierarchical Clustering Method to its proper orbital elements.

The asteroid orbits the Sun in the inner main-belt at a distance of 1.9–2.5 AU once every 3 years and 3 months (1,203 days). Its orbit has an eccentricity of 0.13 and an inclination of 4° with respect to the ecliptic.

Physical characteristics 

Tama is an assumed stony S-type asteroid.

Rotation period 

A large number of rotational lightcurves of Tama were obtained from photometric observations since it has been identified as a binary asteroid (see below). Lightcurve analysis gave a rotation period between 16.4 and 16.464 hours with a brightness variation between 0.08 and 0.41 magnitude, superseding a period of 4 hours from a fragmentary lightcurve obtained in the 1990s.

Tama appears to be somewhat elongated in shape. LCDB's consolidated result gives a period of 16.44 hours and an amplitude of 0.41 magnitude.

Diameter and albedo 

According to the surveys carried out by the Infrared Astronomical Satellite IRAS, the Japanese Akari satellite, the Spitzer Space Telescope and the NEOWISE mission of the Wide-field Infrared Survey Explorer, Tama measures between 11.33 and 13.32 kilometers in diameter and its surface has an albedo between 0.216 and 0.32.

The Collaborative Asteroid Lightcurve Link derives an albedo of 0.2048 and a diameter of 12.82 kilometers based on an absolute magnitude of 11.8.

Satellite 

In 2004, it was announced that Tama has a minor-planet moon, provisionally designated . The satellite was identified based on lightcurve observations with mutual occultation and eclipsing events from 24 December 2003 to 5 January 2004 by Raoul Behrend, René Roy, Claudine Rinner, Pierre Antonini, Petr Pravec, Alan Harris, Stefano Sposetti, Russell Durkee, and Alain Klotz. The moon measures approximately 9 kilometers in diameter. It may orbits 20 km away in a period of 16.4442 hours (synchronously).

Spin axis 

Tamas lightcurve has also been modeled. In 2013, modelling by an international study using photometric data from the US Naval Observatory, the Uppsala Asteroid Photometric Catalogue (UAPC) and the Palmer Divide Observatory, gave a concurring rotation period of 16.4655 hours. Another modeled lightcurve using data from UAPC, the Palomar Transient Factory survey, and individual observers, gave a period of 16.4461 hours as well as two spin axes of (193.0°, 32.0°) and (9.0°, 28.0°) in ecliptic coordinates (λ, β).

Naming 

This minor planet was named after Tama River near the discovering Tokyo Astronomical Observatory in Japan. The official naming citation was mentioned in The Names of the Minor Planets by Paul Herget in 1955.

References

External links 
 (1089) Tama – IAUC 8265, Central Bureau for Astronomical Telegrams
 Asteroids with Satellites, Robert Johnston, johnstonsarchive.net
 Asteroid Lightcurve Database (LCDB), query form (info )
 Dictionary of Minor Planet Names, Google books
 Asteroids and comets rotation curves, CdR – Observatoire de Genève, Raoul Behrend
 Discovery Circumstances: Numbered Minor Planets (1)-(5000) – Minor Planet Center
 
 

001089
Discoveries by Okuro Oikawa
Named minor planets
001089
19271117